Essaï Altounian (in Western Armenian Եսայի Ալթունեան) born on 5 November 1980), sometimes credited as simply Essaï, is a French-Armenian singer, songwriter, keyboardist, music producer and an actor.

Biography 
Essaï Altounian is a French-Armenian singer, songwriter, keyboardist, music producer, and actor. Being of Armenian origin Essai lived and debuted in France. His grandparents escaped from Kharpet during the Armenian genocide.

His first professional experience was the single "Pardonne Moi" from the French group Soul and R & B Ideal 3, in 1999. For his very first time on stage, he performed this song at the Théâtre de l'Empire in Paris for the TV show "Le monde est à Vous", presented by Jacques Martin.

One year later, he signed a new contract at Mercury Universal, solo this time. The success was timid: two singles, a video clip, and some radio and TV interviews. Then he decided to put his inspiration to others' service. For the TV channel TF1, he has been composing since 1998 several TV generics: 50 ans de tubes, C'est la même chanson, Le Grand Soir, Les coups d'humour, Les sosies, the broadcast of Mister France's contest and Retour gagnant.

For the Theater, he has composed opening and scenes music for Anthony Kavanagh's One man show, for the humorist Maxime but also several songs for "Ma femme s'appelle Maurice" by Raffy Shart, played in 24 countries and adapted thereafter in a film directed by Jean-Marie Poiré.

In 2001, he got the role of the Comte Pâris in the musical Roméo et Juliette, which he played until 2002. The same year, he was asked by Anne Barrère, a TV producer, to compose the song for the "Pièces Jaunes" Operation. He also composed the "Un peu de Moi" song performed by Anthony Kavanagh all along his tour.

From 2001 to 2009, he composed, wrote, arranged, and directed songs for Jenifer, Cécilia Cara, Julie Pietri, Grégori Baquet, Michael Youn, Anthony Kavanagh, Michel Legrand, Amaury Vassili, Clara Morgane, and the famous French musicals Le Roi Soleil and Les Demoiselles de Rochefort.

In 2006, he was the musical Director of the new Parisian Revue at the Cabaret Bobino. This review has been played for 2 years and most songs were composed by him.

In 2009, he was the musical Director of La Bataille des chorales, in which 5 choirs competed, 1st evening TV show on TF1 then. In this context, he chose, arranged and realized more than 25 singles. He travelled all over France with Amel Bent, Ophélie Winter, Passy, Patrick Fiori, and Dany Brillant to constitute their respective choir: a Soul choir for Amel, a Girl Power choir for Ophelie, an urban choir for Passy, a Corsican singing choir for Patrick and a Swing Jazz choir for Dany.

In 2010, he was the musical Director of "Le Grand Show des enfants" broadcast on TF1 as a bonus. He arranged 15 singles for young singers from 7 to 15 years old.

In 2011, Essaï worked on his personal album as an interpreter. He wrote, composed, and arranged all singles in a universe that he defines as the Urban soul. He signed a digital distribution contract with Believe. His first single Sweet Family is available since 4 November 2011 on all legal download platforms and it has reached the top of sales at Fnac.com for 5 consecutive weeks. His first video shot between Paris and New York has had a real impact on the net. The clip is widely spread on MTV, MCM, and M6 black.

In 2012, Essaï is the Musical Director of the TV show POP's cool on Canal J.  He composed and realized the album and attends ten TV shows on Canal J. He shared the stage of La Cigale with the troupe on 3 November 2012. In 2102 he also made the new album of the singer Lorie entitled Danse. An album of covers revisited in Latin versions.

In 2013, Essaï was the Musical Director of the show L'Ecole des Fans – New generation – 16 broadcasts aired until 2014 on Gulli every Friday night.

In 2014, Essaï signed a contract in the United States with the MOTOWN (Michael Jackson, Stevie Wonder, Gay Marvin, Diana Ross, The Commodores ...) and Berry Gordy's son, Kerry Gordy. Together, they produced a new single "FAMILY" released on the label KERRY GORDY Records.

In 2015, he was one of the 6 members of Genealogy, the band representing Armenia at the Eurovision Song Contest which took place in Vienna, Austria. Armenia has been qualified for the first semifinal on 19 May, and participated in the grand final on 23 May, finishing 16th out of 40 countries.

In 2016, he was on the jury of the "Destination Eurovision" show on the Armenian channel Arm public TV in order to select the next candidate representing Armenia at the Eurovision Song Contest through a 10-episode program, and her candidate won the selection.

In 2017, Essaï composed, arranged, and recorded the first album of the Franco-Belgian artist Carla Stark. He composed the 12 tracks of the pop-folk album "Karma" whose first single is "Start starting".

In 2018, the American channel CBS called him to be part of the International jury of the new great talent Show – made in the US – "THE WORLD'S BEST". Along with Drew Barrymore, Faith Hill, and RuPaul and animated by the famous James Corden, Essaï recorded 10 shows in L.A. as the French judge and "Music Expert". Broadcast from 3 February 2019 on the CBS channel in the premiere of the Super Bowl.

Career 
At the age of 12 Essaï composed his first song, and at the age of 19 signed a contract with Sony France as the lead singer of the urban and pop idol group "Ideal-3". The pop/urban-inspired top ten hit "Pardonne-Moi" and was played on all major French radio stations, including NRJ and Fun Radio. The band toured all of the major venues and arenas of the time. They also appeared on numerous television shows including Jacques Martin. Essaï left his law studies at the Jean Monnet University Paris, to pursue his passion for music.

When Essai was 21 he left the band and signed a solo contract with Mercury Universal. As a solo artist, he began to receive many invitations from different TV shows including invitations to write and produce for other artists. Essaï was approached to contribute his inspiration and artistic sensitivity to artists like Jenifer. He composed songs for her album, which eventually received the prestigious Diamond Plaque award.

Landing in the role of Count Paris in Gérard Presgurvic's musical comedy "Romeo and Juliet" Essaï performed in front of thousands of spectators across France, Belgium and Switzerland. The show's album sold 2 million copies. Soon, France's First Lady Bernadette Chirac asked him to write and produce "Un Peu de Moi" and within a short period of time, the single went gold.

Essaï collaborated with Michel Legrand. They co-produced 25 songs together for "Les Demoiselles de Rochefort" and had a successful run at Palais des Congrès in Paris. Then he wrote, " S'aimer est interdit " for the famous musical comedy "Le Roi Soleil" for Warner Music France. That album went double Platinum with over 3 million tickets sold during the three years of its run. In 2008, he composed the soundtrack for the film "Incontrôlable" starring Michael Youn.
Writing and arranging musical pieces for many shows Essaï also directed entire musical productions such as mythical Parisian Cabarets, "Bobino". Since 2010, Essaï has been the musical director for "La Bataille des chorales, Le grand show des enfants, Pop's Cool, L'Ecole des fans "—all of them were on air on the TF1 channel (France).
Taking a big step across the Atlantic to the United States Essaï reached out to Kerry Gordy from Motown music. It was Kerry's 14-year-old daughter who made her father pay attention, by giving him a score of 11 on a scale of 1 to 10.
Essaï is really concerned by the story of his grandparents and in 2015 for the centennial of the Armenian genocide, he wrote, composed and produced a song called "Je n'oublie pas / Chem Morana ", dedicated to the 1.5 million Armenian victims of the 1915 genocide.

Eurovision 
Altounian is a member of the supergroup Genealogy, who represented Armenia in the 60th Eurovision Song Contest hold in Vienna. He became an Armenian citizen along with the other foreign members of Genealogy on 28 April 2015 after being given Armenian passports by President Serzh Sargsyan.

References

External links

https://www.essaimusic.com

1980 births
French pop singers
French people of Armenian descent
Singers from Paris
21st-century Armenian male singers
Armenian pop singers
Citizens of Armenia through descent
Living people
21st-century French male singers
Genealogy (band) members